Wave audio or variant, may refer to:

 Sound, vibrations carried on acoustic waves
 Acoustic wave, audio waves that carry sound
 .wav, waveform audio file format
 FM synthesis, sound synthesis technique, by manipulating generated pure waves
 Wavetable synthesis, sound synthesis technique
 Sample-based synthesis, sound synthesis technique, with a table of waves (box of samples)
 Waves Audio, Israeli professional sound company